Piuma is a 2016 Italian drama film directed by Roan Johnson. It was selected to compete for the Golden Lion at the 73rd Venice International Film Festival.

Cast
 Blu Yoshimi as Cate
 Michela Cescon as Carla Pardini
 Sergio Pierattini as Franco Pardini
 Francesco Colella as Alfredo
 Luigi Fedele as Ferro
 Brando Pacitto as Brando

References

External links
 

2016 films
2016 drama films
Films directed by Roan Johnson
Italian drama films
2010s Italian-language films
2010s pregnancy films
2010s Italian films